Judge Vance may refer to:

Bob Vance (jurist) (born 1961), judge of Alabama's 10th Judicial Circuit
Robert Smith Vance (1931–1989), judge of the United States Court of Appeals for the Fifth Circuit
Sarah S. Vance (born 1950), judge of the United States District Court for the Eastern District of Louisiana